Shimon Adaf (born 1972) is an Israeli poet and author born in Sderot.

Biography  
Shimon Adaf's first book of poetry, Icarus' Monologue, won a prize from the Israeli Ministry of Education. In 1996–2000, Adaf studied at Tel Aviv University, simultaneously writing articles on literature, film and rock music for Israeli newspapers. In 2000–2005, he worked as a prose editor for Keter Publishing House. He is currently the chair of the creative writing program at Ben Gurion University in Israel.

In 2013, he won Israel's prestigious Sapir Prize for his novel Moxy Nox.

He was interviewed on the Shaping Business Minds Through Art podcast in 2020.

Awards
 2007 - Prime Minister's Prize for Hebrew Literary Works
 2010 - Yehuda Amichai Award
 2012 - Sapir Prize
 2017 - Newman Prize

Books

Poetry

 Icarus' Monologue, 1997
 That Which I Thought Shadow Is the Real Body, 2002
 Aviva-No, 2009

Prose

(All titles given in approximate English translation)

 One Mile and Two Days Before Sunset, 2004
 The Buried Heart, 2007
 Sunburnt Faces, 2008
 Frost, 2010
 Mox Nox, 2011
 Undercities, 2012
 The Wedding Gifts, 2014
 Detective's Complaint, 2015
 Shadrach, 2017
 Rise and Call, 2017
 I Loved Loving, 2019

Non-Fiction

 Art and War, 2016 (with Lavie Tidhar)
 I am others, 2018

References

External links 

 

1972 births
20th-century Israeli poets
Living people
Tel Aviv University alumni
Israeli literary critics
Hebrew-language poets
International Writing Program alumni
21st-century Israeli poets
Israeli male poets
20th-century male writers
21st-century male writers
Adi Lautman Interdisciplinary Program for Outstanding Students alumni